The development of the gonads is part of the prenatal development of the reproductive system and ultimately forms the testes in males and the ovaries in females. The gonads initially develop from the mesothelial layer of the peritoneum.

The ovary is differentiated into a central part, the medulla, covered by a surface layer, the germinal epithelium. The immature ova originate from cells from the dorsal endoderm of the yolk sac. Once they have reached the gonadal ridge they are called oogonia. Development proceeds and the oogonia become fully surrounded by a layer of connective tissue cells (pre-granulosa cells). In this way, the rudiments of the ovarian follicles are formed.

In the testis, a network of tubules fuse to create the seminiferous tubules. Via the rete testis, the seminiferous tubules become connected with outgrowths from the mesonephros, which form the efferent ducts of the testis. The descent of the testes consists of the opening of a connection from the testis to its final location at the anterior abdominal wall, followed by the development of the gubernaculum, which subsequently pulls and translocates the testis down into the developing scrotum. Ultimately, the passageway closes behind the testis. A failure in this process causes an indirect inguinal hernia.

Germ cells migrate from near the allantois and colonize the primordial gonads. In the female, the germ cells colonise the cortex and become oogonia. In the male, the germ cells colonise the seminiferous cords of the medulla, becoming spermatogonia.

Before differentiation

The first appearance of the gonad is essentially the same in the two sexes, and consists in a thickening of the mesothelial layer of the peritoneum. The thick plate of epithelium extends deeply, pushing before it the mesoderm and forming a distinct projection. This is termed the gonadal ridge. The gonadal ridge, in turn, develops into a gonad. This is a testis in the male and an ovary in the female.

At first, the mesonephros and gonadal ridge are continuous, but as the embryo grows the gonadal ridge gradually becomes pinched off from the mesonephros. However, some cells of mesonephric origin join the gonadal ridge. Furthermore, the gonadal ridge still remains connected to the remnant of that body by a fold of peritoneum, namely the mesorchium or mesovarium. About the seventh week the distinction of sex in the gonadal ridge begins to be perceptible.

Ovary
The ovary is thus formed mainly from the genital ridge and partly from the mesonephros. Later the mass is differentiated into a central part, the medulla of ovary, covered by a surface layer, the germinal epithelium. Between the cells of the germinal epithelium a number of larger cells, the immature ova, are found. The immature ova, in turn, are carried into the stroma beneath by bud-like ingrowths (genital cords of the germinal epithelium). The surface germinal epithelium ultimately forms the permanent epithelial covering of this organ. Furthermore, it soon loses its connection with the central mass. Instead, the tunica albuginea of the ovaries develops between them.

Origin of ova
During early embryonic development, cells from the dorsal endoderm of the yolk sac migrate along the hindgut to the gonadal ridge. These primordial germ cells (PGCs) multiply by mitosis and once they have reached the gonadal ridge they are called oogonia (diploid stem cells of the ovary).

Once oogonia enter this area they attempt to associate with the other somatic cells, derived from both the peritoneum and mesonephros. Development proceeds and the oogonia become fully surrounded by a layer of connective tissue cells (pre-granulosa cells) in an irregular manner. In this way, the rudiments of the ovarian follicles are formed.

Origin of granulosa cells
The embryological origin of granulosa cells remains controversial. In the 1970s, evidence emerged that the first cells to make contact with the oogonia were of mesonephric origin. It was suggested that mesonephric cells already closely associated with the oogonia proliferated throughout development to form the granulosa cell layer.

Recently this hypothesis has been challenged with some thorough histology. Sawyer et al. hypothesized that in sheep most of the granulosa cells develop from cells of the mesothelium (i.e., epithelial cells from the presumptive surface epithelium of the ovary).

Descent of the ovaries
Just as in the male, there is a gubernaculum in the female, which effects a considerable change in the position of the ovary. The gubernaculum in the female lies in contact with the fundus of the uterus and adheres to this organ, and thus the ovary can only descend as far as to this level. The part of the gubernaculum between the ovary and the uterus ultimately becomes the proper ovarian ligament, while the part between the uterus and the labium majus forms the round ligament of the uterus. A pouch of peritoneum analogous to the vaginal process in the male accompanies it along the inguinal canal: it is called the canal of Nuck.

Pathology
In rare cases, the gubernaculum may fail to contract adhesions to the uterus, and then the ovary descends through the inguinal canal into the labium majus; under these circumstances, its position resembles that of the testis.

Testis
The testis is developed in much the same way as the ovary, originating from mesothelium as well as mesonephros. Like the ovary, in its earliest stages it consists of a central mass covered by a surface epithelium. In the central mass a series of cords appear, and the periphery of the mass is converted into the tunica albuginea, thus excluding the surface epithelium from any part in the formation of the tissue of the testis. The cords of the central mass run together toward the future hilum and form a network which ultimately becomes the rete testis. On the other hand, the seminiferous tubules are developed from the cords distal to the hilum, and between them connective-tissue septa extend. Via the rete testis, the seminiferous tubules become connected with outgrowths from the mesonephros, which form the efferent ducts of the testis.

Descent of the testes
The descent of the testes consists of the opening of a connection from the testis to its final location at the anterior abdominal wall, followed by the development of the gubernaculum, which subsequently pulls and translocates the testis down into the developing scrotum. Ultimately, the passageway closes behind the testis.

Opening of connection
At an early period of fetal life the testes are placed at the back part of abdominal cavity, behind the peritoneum, and each is attached by a peritoneal fold, the mesorchium, to the mesonephros. From the front of the mesonephros a fold of peritoneum termed the inguinal fold grows forward to meet and fuse with a peritoneal fold, the inguinal crest, which grows backward from the antero-lateral abdominal wall. The testis thus acquires an indirect connection with the anterior abdominal wall. At the same time, a portion of the peritoneal cavity lateral to these fused folds is marked off as the future vaginal process.

Development of gubernaculum
Also, in the inguinal crest a structure, the gubernaculum testis, makes its appearance. This is at first a slender band, extending from that part of the skin of the groin which afterward forms the scrotum through the inguinal canal to the body and epididymis of the testis. As  and contains the upper part of the gubernaculum, and ultimately also the internal spermatic vessels; the one below, the plica gubernatrix, contains the lower part of the gubernaculum.

The gubernaculum grows into a thick cord. It ends below at the abdominal inguinal ring in a tube of peritoneum, the vaginal process, which protrudes itself down the inguinal canal. By the fifth month the lower part of the gubernaculum still is a thick cord, while the upper part has disappeared. The lower part now consists of a central core of smooth muscle fibers, surrounded by a firm layer of striated muscle elements, connected, behind the peritoneum, with the abdominal wall.

Translocation
As the testes develops, the main portion of the lower end of the gubernaculum is carried, following the skin to which it is attached, to the bottom of this pouch. Other bands are carried to the medial side of the thigh and to the perineum. The tube of peritoneum constituting the vaginal process projects itself downward into the inguinal canal, and emerges at the external inguinal ring, pushing before it a part of the obliquus internus and the aponeurosis of the obliquus externus, which form respectively the cremaster muscle and the external spermatic fascia. The vaginal process forms a gradually elongating pouch, which eventually reaches the bottom of the scrotum, and behind this pouch the testis is drawn by the growth of the body of the fetus, for the gubernaculum does not grow proportionately with the growth of other parts, and therefore the testis, being attached by the gubernaculum to the bottom of the scrotum, is prevented from rising as the body grows, and is instead drawn first into the inguinal canal and eventually into the scrotum. It seems certain also that the gubernacular cord becomes shortened as development proceeds, and this assists in causing the testis to reach the bottom of the scrotum.

Closing of connection

By the end of the eighth month the testis has reached the scrotum, preceded by the vaginal process, which communicates by its upper extremity with the peritoneal cavity. Just before birth the upper part of the vaginal process, at the internal inguinal ring, usually becomes closed, and this obliteration extends gradually downward to within a short distance of the testis. The process of peritoneum surrounding the testis is now entirely cut off from the general peritoneal cavity and constitutes the tunica vaginalis.

Pathology
If the internal inguinal ring does not close properly, then there is a risk that other contents of the abdominal cavity protrudes through the passageway and cause indirect inguinal hernia.

See also
 Sexual differentiation in humans

References

Embryology of urogenital system